Mari Ushem (Meadow Mari and ; ,  'Mari Union') is a Russian non-governmental organization, whose activity is dedicated to preservation of the Mari culture.

Origins 
Mari Ushem traces its history back to March 1917, when the first ethnic organizations appeared among the Eastern Mari (north of modern Bashkortostan), followed by the Mari of Tsaryovokokshaysk and Urzhum uyezds. They aimed to provide education for Mari and to bridge the 'culture gap' between the Mari and their neighbours (Russians and Tatars). These groups were united by the Central Mari Union (Mari Ushem) in Kazan. It was banned in December 1918, soon after the Bolsheviks took over Kazan, and the Mari societies were later replaced by Mari sections under local Communist party committees.

Re-establishment
Mari Ushem was re-established in 1989 at the joint meeting of regional offices of the All-Russian Society for the Protection of Historical and Cultural Monuments, the Soviet Culture Foundation and Memorial society in Mari ASSR. The inaugural congress was held on 8 April 1990.

Mari National Rebirth Party 
Mari National Rebirth Party "Ushem" was a political party in Mari El, founded in December 1994 as the political wing of the Mari Ushem movement. The party had around 300 members. Mari Ushem supported Anatoly Popov in 1991 and 1996 presidential elections in Mari El.

References 

Mari people
1917 establishments in Russia
1990 establishments in Russia
Indigenous organizations in Russia